The 2022–23 East Tennessee State Buccaneers men’s basketball team represents East Tennessee State University in the 2022–23 NCAA Division I men's basketball season. The Buccaneers, led by second-year head coach Desmond Oliver, play their home games at the Freedom Hall Civic Center in Johnson City, Tennessee, as members of the Southern Conference.

Previous season
The Buccaneers finished the 2021–22 season 15–17, 7–11 in SoCon play to finish in eighth place. They lost to The Citadel in the first round of the SoCon Tournament.

Roster

Schedule and results

|-
!colspan=12 style=|Exhibition

|-
!colspan=12 style=| Non-conference regular season

|-
!colspan=12 style=| SoCon Regular season

|-
!colspan=12 style=| SoCon Tournament

Source

References 

East Tennessee State Buccaneers men's basketball seasons
East Tennessee State
East Tennessee State Buccaneers men's basketball
East Tennessee State Buccaneers men's basketball